Ostafyevo  is a "B" class international airport, located  to the south of Moscow Ring Road in Novomoskovsky administrative okrug of Moscow. The airport is owned by Gazpromavia company, a division of Gazprom. It was renovated and opened for civilian flights in 2000 on the grounds of a former military airbase. Ostafyevo features a new modern glass terminal, and caters primarily to business aviation.

It can handle aircraft such as the Boeing 737-700, Bombardier Global Express, Dassault Falcon 2000, Antonov An-12, Ilyushin Il-18, Yakovlev Yak-42, Tupolev Tu-134 and smaller, as well as helicopters of all types.

Description

The airport belongs to the Russian Ministry of defence and is operated jointly with Gazpromavia. It is home to Gazpromavia and the cargo airline Shar Ink. The only authorized handler is Aviapartner LLC.

The airport was opened for international flights in 2007. It fully meets the modern standards of safety and service organization of international and domestic flights, all types of collateral obtained certificates of conformity.

Currently Ostafyevo is positioned as an international business airport, ready to provide services regarding to ground handling, parking (both on apron and in hangars), refuelling, catering, transfer and accommodation for crew, customs assistance, aeronautical information and organizational support, including navigational support for foreign aircraft flying in the Russian Federation.

On the grounds of Ostafyevo are located certificated maintenance centres for business jets (certified by Dassault Aviation for Falcons) and helicopter EC-120B Colibri. The airport complex has 26 open aircraft parkings, 12 of them are within walking distance from the terminal. There are two heated hangars for four aircraft. Places in the hangars are equipped with all the necessary equipment, tow bars are available. Aircraft cleaning services are available. The passenger terminal of the airport can handle up to 70 passengers per hour on domestic routes and 40 passengers per hour on international flights.

For ease of transport to suburban Moscow, the reconstruction of the access road is in progress.

Interesting facts

 In 1803, in Ostafyevo estate, then belonging to Prince A. Vyazemsky (son of P. Vyazemsky), landed a balloon of the first Russian woman to fly in Princess P. Gagarina. Thereafter, the famous balloon was kept in the Ostafyevo estate for a long time.
 In the second half of the 1940s, the airfield Ostafyevo was already on use as an airport: from here planes Li-2 performed regular postal passenger and cargo-passenger flights to various cities of the USSR.

References

External links
 Official website of the airport
 Official website of the authorized airport's handler, Aviapartner
 Airport Ostafyevo

Airports in Moscow
Gazprom
Novomoskovsky Administrative Okrug